R409 road  may refer to:
 R409 road (Ireland)
 R409 road (South Africa)